John Yapp (born 9 April 1983) is a Welsh international rugby union player, currently with Edinburgh. He first played for Cardiff during the Christmas period in 2002. He made his first team debut against Ebbw Vale on Boxing Day at the age of 18. Despite his young age, he was featured in 17 of a possible 19 games by the end of the season and had been called up to train with the Wales-under-21 squad.

Yapp has represented Cardiff Youth and under-21s, winning cup and league medals and playing for Wales at under-19 level. Originally educated at Cowbridge Comprehensive School, he had first team experience with the Llantwit Major and Pontypridd clubs before becoming a full-time Cardiff Blues squad member.

Yapp won his first cap for Wales as a substitute in the victory over England in the RBS 6 Nations in February 2005 during the team's Grand Slam winning season.

In the summer of 2008, Yapp had discussions with club coach Dai Young and national coach Warren Gatland about the possibility of switching from loose head to tight head prop. He then headed out to Australia to play for Tuggeranong Vikings during the Northern hemispheres off season in an effort to become familiar with his new role in the scrum, before returning to the Cardiff Blues for the start of their domestic season.

In 2014, Yapp was listed as a replacement for London Irish during the Aviva Premiership round 17.

Wasps and former Wales prop John Yapp has announced his retirement from rugby after suffering a back injury. The 32-year-old made 13 appearances for Premiership side Wasps after signing from Edinburgh in July 2014. Yapp also won 21 test caps for Wales, and was part of the squad that won a Six Nations Grand Slam in 2005.

References

External links
Cardiff profile
WRU profile
Tuggeranong Vikings Profile

1983 births
Cardiff Rugby players
Cardiff RFC players
Living people
Llantwit Major RFC players
Rugby union players from Cardiff
Pontypridd RFC players
Rugby union props
Wales international rugby union players
Welsh expatriate rugby union players
Expatriate rugby union players in Australia
British expatriates in Australia
Edinburgh Rugby players
Wasps RFC players